Alcimochthes is a genus of Asian crab spiders that was first described by Eugène Louis Simon in 1885.  it contains three species, found in eastern Asia: A. limbatus, A. melanophthalmus, and A. meridionalis.

See also
 List of Thomisidae species

References

Further reading

Araneomorphae genera
Spiders of Asia
Thomisidae